The 2002 Chicago Marathon was the 25th running of the annual marathon race in Chicago, United States and was held on October 13. The elite men's race was won by Morocco's Khalid Khannouchi in a time of 2:05:56 hours and the women's race was won by British athlete Paula Radcliffe in 2:17:18. Radcliffe's time was a new marathon world best, knocking 89 seconds off the previous mark by Catherine Ndereba (the runner-up in the race). The record only lasted six months, as Radcliffe improved it again at the 2003 London Marathon.

Results

Men

Women

References

Results. Association of Road Racing Statisticians. Retrieved 2020-04-10.

External links 
 Official website

Chicago Marathon
Chicago
2000s in Chicago
2002 in Illinois
Chicago Marathon
Chicago Marathon